Markham Sound is a strait in the eastern part of the Franz Josef Land archipelago in Arkhangelsk Oblast, Russia. It was first reported and named in 1874 by the Austro-Hungarian North Pole Expedition. The name commemorates the British Royal Navy officer Albert Hastings Markham (1841–1918).

The Markham Sound separates the northern island group from the southern group of the Franz Josef Land archipelago. From the west the strait starts at the British Channel, runs in a southeasterly direction and ends in the Austrian Strait.

Sources 
 Топографическая карта U-37,38,39,40 - 1 : 1 000 000

Straits of the Arctic Ocean
Straits of Russia
Franz Josef Land
Bodies of water of Arkhangelsk Oblast